Anthony Jay Washington (born November 10, 1981) is a Filipino-American professional basketball player for Yokohama Excellence of the Japanese B.League.

College career
Born in Zambales, Philippines, Washington played for the Eckerd College Tritons during his college career. In 2002, he had per-game averages of 20.5 pts (on 36% 3PT shooting) and 3.9 rebs in 32 games. He then raised his averages to 21.7 pts and 5.5 rebs in 32 games the next season. For his senior season, Washington was named to the Sunshine State Conference All Tournament Team. Washington also suited up for the Gwinnett Grizzlies at the 2004 LA Summer Pro League.

Professional career
Washington was selected 1st overall draft pick in 2005 PBA draft by the FedEx Express and was traded to the Talk 'N Text Phone Pals during draft day. Despite putting good numbers, high expectations and the deep rotation of Talk 'N Text led him to being traded to the San Miguel Beermen in 2008 in exchange for the draft rights of 2008 3rd overall pick Jayson Castro. During the 2010 PBA Fiesta Conference, he was awarded the Best Player of the Conference. He is a three-time Mythical First Team Awardee in the PBA. He was then awarded another Best Player of the Conference Award during Game 4 of the 2010–11 PBA Philippine Cup Finals.

On June 11, 2013, he was sent to the GlobalPort Batang Pier after a trade that also sent Japeth Aguilar to Barangay Ginebra.

On September 22, 2014, he was traded to the Talk 'N Text Tropang Texters for Nonoy Baclao, rookie Harold Arboleda and the rights for Talk 'N Text's  2nd round pick in the 2018 draft. This trade is a part of a series of trades between Talk 'N Text, GlobalPort, and NLEX Road Warriors. He returned to Talk 'N Text after six years of playing with San Miguel/Petron and GlobalPort.

On October 13, 2016, he was traded to the Rain or Shine Elasto Painters in exchange for JR Quiñahan.

On February 21, 2019, after being released by Rain or Shine, he signed with TNT KaTropa for his third stint with the franchise.

On December 3, 2021, Washington, along with two future second-round picks, was traded to the Blackwater Bossing for Carl Bryan Cruz.

In June 2022 while he was still a free agent, Washington played 3x3 for Pretty Huge in a regional tournament in Thailand.

On September 8, 2022, Washington signed with Ryukyu Golden Kings of the Japanese B.League. He parted ways with the team on December 7, 2022.

On December 15, 2022, Washington signed with Yokohama Excellence of the Japanese B.League.

PBA career statistics

As of the end of 2021 season

Season-by-season averages

|-
| align="left" | 
| align="left" rowspan="3" |Talk 'N Text
| 18 || 15.1 || .336 || .152 || .619 || 3.7 || .9 || .3 || .4 || 5.3
|-
| align="left" | 
| 61 || 29.0 || .475 || .241 || .653 || 7.1 || 1.7 || .6 || .6 || 13.5
|-
| align="left" | 
| 37 || 27.2 || .458 || .305 || .692 || 7.4 || 1.8 || .6 || .8 || 12.6
|-
| align="left" | 
| align="left" rowspan="4" |San Miguel / Petron
| 52 || 29.8 || .473 || .352 || .647 || 7.5 || 2.1 || .6 || .6 || 12.8
|-
| align="left" | 
| 41 || 32.3 || .435 || .275 || .820 || 7.1 ||  1.9 || .7 || .5 || 14.6
|-
| align="left" | 
| 35 || 35.0 || .410 || .283 || .662 || 9.5 ||  2.3 || .5 || 1.1 || 15.9
|-
| align="left" | 
| 14 || 27.3 || .439 || .351 || .818 || 6.3 || 2.2 || .8 || .7 || 14.4
|-
| align="left" | 
| align="left" | Petron / GlobalPort
| 41 || 26.5 || .370 || .273 || .716 || 6.6 || 1.3 || .4 || .9 || 9.6
|-
| align="left" | 
| align="left" | GlobalPort
| 28 || 33.3 || .435 || .325 || .795 || 7.5 || 1.9 || 1.1 || .5 || 15.6
|-
| align="left" | 
| align="left" | Talk 'N Text
| 47 || 19.6 || .347 || .276 || .822 || 3.9 || .9 || .4 || .4 || 7.0
|-
| align="left" | 
| align="left" | GlobalPort
| 36 || 25.5 || .405 || .280 || .641 || 5.8 || 1.4 || .8 || .7 || 8.6
|-
| align="left" | 
| align="left" rowspan="2" |Rain or Shine
| 27 || 20.1 || .363 || .244 || .625 || 5.6 || 1.3 || .6 || .6 || 7.3
|-
| align="left" | 
| 24 || 12.2 || .344 || .200 || .529 || 2.7 || .9 || .6 || .0 || 3.5
|-
| align="left" | 
| align="left" rowspan="2" |TNT
| 25 || 7.1 || .298 || .207 || .615 || 1.8 || .2 || .3 || .1 || 1.7
|-
| align="left" | 
| 20 || 14.3 || .421 || .268 || .846 || 3.1 || .7 || .6 || .7 || 4.3
|-
| align="left" | 
| align="left" | TNT / Blackwater
| 10 || 11.8 || .238 || .133 || 1.000 || 1.6 || .8 || .4 || .5 || 1.4
|-class=sortbottom
| align="center" colspan=2 | Career
| 516 || 24.8 || .421 || .281 || .704 || 6.0 || 1.5 || .6 || .6 || 10.3

References

1981 births
Living people
American men's basketball players
Barako Bull Energy draft picks
Basketball players from Zambales
Blackwater Bossing players
Eckerd Tritons men's basketball players
Filipino emigrants to the United States
Filipino expatriate basketball people in Japan
Filipino men's 3x3 basketball players
Filipino men's basketball players
Filipino people of African-American descent
NorthPort Batang Pier players
Philippine Basketball Association All-Stars
Philippines men's national basketball team players
Power forwards (basketball)
Rain or Shine Elasto Painters players
Ryukyu Golden Kings players
San Miguel Beermen players
TNT Tropang Giga players
Yokohama Excellence players